MET Group is a Swiss-based European energy company with activities in natural gas, and power markets, focused on multi-commodity wholesale, trading and sales, renewable energy and industrial assets. MET was founded in 2007, starting as a MOL subsidiary (Magyar Olaj- és Gázipari Nyilvánosan Működő Részvénytársaság, Hungarian Oil and Gas Public Limited Company). In 2021, MET Group's natural gas trading volume was 55 BCM (13 mi³).

Corporate history 

MET Group was founded by Benjamin Lakatos in 2007 as an unlisted joint-stock company; the stocks were originally owned by MOL and György Nagy's WISD Holding. MET Group has been present in Zug, Switzerland since 2011 and completed its corporate reorganization in 2013, remaining active in the Hungarian market. In early 2016, the annual gas trading volume reached 16 BCM (3.8 mi³). MET Capital Partners AG – a company owned by Benjamin Lakatos – acquired the MET stocks from MOL and WISD in a 2018 management buyout with financial capital obtained from the Dutch ING Bank. In January 2020, Keppel Energy Switzerland acquired a 20 per cent stake in MET Group. Keppel Energy Switzerland and MET Group have since entered into a strategic partnership. In November 2020, MET Group bought the Frankfurt, Germany based natural gas storage company Gas-Union GmbH. Gas Union's natural gas storage capacity equals . In November 2022, Keppel sold half of its 20 per cent stake in MET Group to MET Management. Since 2010, MET has been part of Handelszeitung's list of Switzerland's Top 500 companies by revenue. In 2022, MET placed 20th with a revenue of CHF 19.566 billion (EUR 18.1 billion). In November 2022, Lakatos was elected as Chairman of the Board of Directors.

Business activity

Natural gas 

MET Group's main business activity is the trade and wholesale of natural gas. Neue Zürcher Zeitung writes that 70 per cent of the company's revenue come from natural gas sales. According to a Hungarian news magazine, MET trades 12.2 per cent of the total natural gas that is consumed in mainland Europe. In 2021, the company sold 55 BCM (13 mi³) of natural gas. MET is present in 27 national gas markets and 22 international trading hubs. Hungarian business news site napi.hu concludes that MET uses natural gas as a "transition fuel" in the transition from fossil fuel based electric power to electric power from renewable sources.

Electric power 

Since 2014, MET has been operating the biggest natural gas power plant in Hungary, the Dunamenti Erőmű in Százhalombatta near Budapest. In 2018, MET Group completed the construction of a solar power plant next to the gas-fired plant. By May 2022, MET Group had two operating solar power plants in Hungary with a power output of over 60 MWp, and an additional three solar plants with a combined power output of more than 150 MWp under construction. Hungarian magazine NRGreport reports that the solar power plants were financed with so-called "green bonds". The total volume of these bonds is 64.8 billion. Ft (168.5 million. EUR). In early 2021, MET Group acquired the 42 MW Black Sea Wind Park in Bulgaria. This was followed by the 60 MW Suvorovo Wind Park in Bulgaria, in late July 2021. The latter is composed of 30 Gamesa G90 2 MW wind turbines that produce up to 120 GWh of renewable energy annually. In April 2022, MET Group announced that they signed purchase agreements to take over five early-stage greenfield photovoltaic projects in Italy, totalling an expected installed power of 213 MWp. The ready-to-build-stage will be reached in 2024. In addition to that, the company bought a 100 per cent stake in a 50 MW solar project in Spain, that will be commissioned in 2023. As a result, the current expected power output of the renewable energy power plants of MET Group (including development-stage and operational-stage projects) is 714 MWp.

Liquefied natural gas 

On 1 March 2016, MET Group also began trading liquefied natural gas (LNG). The first LNG delivery arrived in port in July 2016. MET Group provides countries in South-East Europe and Mediterranean Europe with LNG.

References

Energy companies of Switzerland
Swiss companies established in 2007
Energy companies established in 2007
Companies based in Zug